Vancouver Golf Club, located in the Canadian city of Coquitlam, British Columbia, is the oldest golf club in the Lower Mainland.

Established  in 1910, it opened the following year on a former sheep farm on the west side of Blue Mountain. The suburban club was originally considered to be far outside of the major population centre of Vancouver, requiring a trip on the British Columbia Electric Railway and often an overnight stay at the club. Today, the club is considered to be centrally located in the Lower Mainland.

The club has hosted the Canadian Women's Open three times on the LPGA Tour, in 1988, 1991, and 2012. The first two events were held as the du Maurier Classic, a women's major, and were won by Sally Little and Nancy Scranton, respectively. The 2012 edition was won by 15-year-old amateur Lydia Ko and the tournament is scheduled to return in 2015. Vancouver Golf Club also hosted one Senior PGA Tour event in the 1985, the Canada Senior Open Championship, won by Peter Thomson of Australia.

The club became the subject of controversy in 2008 when it became known that a rule was implemented eight years earlier that required new members to be able to speak English, regardless of their ability to pay the $65,000 full-play membership fee. The club stated it did not forbid members from speaking other languages while on the grounds, but required the English proficiency in order to ensure that members could understood and abide by club rules.

Scorecard

Notable members
 Doug Grimston, Vancouver Golf Club president and Canadian Amateur Hockey Association president

See also
List of golf courses in British Columbia

References

External links

Sports venues in Coquitlam
Golf clubs and courses in British Columbia